Etienne de Rocher's first full-length effort, Etienne de Rocher, was released in February 2006 by Fog City Records.

This Enhanced CD contains bonus audio and live concert video.

Track listing
"Meditation # C.O.B." 
"Juniper Rose" 
"The Lizard Song" 
"Providence" 
"Six Feet" 
"Big Black Wall" 
"There's Real and There's Moonshine" 
"Bama Bino Goodbye" 
"You Became a Knife" 
"Come Twilight" 
"Everybody Thinks You're a Smash" 
"Goodnight" 
"Cerebro *"
"The Lizard Song" (solo version) *
"Everybody Thinks You're a Smash" (solo version) *
DATA TRACK (Enhanced CD)

[*] Appears only on promotional version

Personnel
Etienne de Rocher - vocals, guitar, keyboards, percussion, bass
 Todd Roper - drums
 Todd Sickafoose - bass

Dan Prothero - producer, engineer, editing, mixing, programming

Etienne de Rocher albums
2006 debut albums
Fog City Records albums